Citrus × sinensis (sometimes written Citrus sinensis), a hybrid between pomelo (Citrus maxima) and mandarin (Citrus reticulata), also known as the sweet oranges, is a commonly cultivated family of oranges that includes blood oranges and navel oranges.

Uses
The orange fruit is an important agricultural product, used for both the juicy fruit pulp and the aromatic peel (rind). Orange blossoms (the flowers) are used in several different ways, as are the leaves and wood of the tree.

Flowers
 The orange blossom, which is the state flower of Florida, is highly fragrant and traditionally associated with good fortune. It has long been popular in bridal bouquets and head wreaths.
 Orange blossom essence is an important component in the making of perfume.
 Orange blossom petals can also be made into a delicately citrus-scented counterpart to rosewater, known as "orange blossom water" or "orange flower water". It is a common ingredient in French and Middle Eastern cuisines, especially in desserts and baked goods. In the United States, orange flower water is used to make orange blossom scones and marshmallows.
 In Spain, fallen blossoms are dried and used to make orange tea.
 Orange blossom honey (or citrus honey) is obtained by putting beehives in the citrus groves while trees bloom. By this method, bees also pollinate seeded citrus varieties. This type of honey has an orangey taste and is highly prized.

Leaves
 Orange leaves can be boiled to make orange tea.

Wood
 Orangewood  sticks  are used as cuticle pushers in manicures and pedicures, and as spudgers for manipulating slender electronic wires.
 Orangewood is used in the same way as mesquite, oak, and hickory for seasoning grilled meat.

Orange trees in movable pots, so that they can be placed indoors for the winter
Orange flowers
Unripened fruit
Blood oranges
Oranges on the branch
Oranges on a tree
A mature tree in Galicia, Spain

Chemical composition
Orange fruit and leaf both are reported to contain indole alkaloids including N,N-DMT.

Threats

Giant swallowtail larva 
Giant swallowtail caterpillars (Papilio cresphontes) cause serious damage to this crop, especially to young trees.

See also
 The orange blossom gives its touristic nickname to the Costa del Azahar ("Orange blossom coast"), the Castellón seaboard.
 Citrus greening disease - bacterial disease killing orange trees and other citrus fruits grown

References

External links

 
Citrus hybrids
Fruit trees